Brunswick Maine Street Station, or Brunswick station, is a multi-modal, multi-use real estate development in Brunswick, Maine. Located on Maine Street, it consists of commercial offices, service centers, healthcare, retail, restaurants, theater and residential space. Brunswick Station is also a transportation hub for city buses, taxis, and passenger trains.

The development is split into two parts, the "West" and "East" sides (West and East of Union Street respectively). The west side will consist mostly of residential apartments and homes, along with some retail and commercial office space. The east side consists of mostly retail and commercial office space, along with some apartments. The east side is also the location of the passenger train station. This development was built on the vacant lots surrounding the railroad junction between Portland, Lewiston, Augusta, and Rockland.

History 

The first steps of the project began on August 20, 1998, when the Town of Brunswick purchased the land that the development is on for $655,000. Not until 2004 (four years after the Downeaster'''s Boston-Portland service began) did the town begin to consider creating a commercial development around a train station.

On May 28, 2008, the planning board approved the final plan for Maine Street Station. The plan, developed by JHR Development of Maine, was submitted on January 15, 2008. The current plan was scaled down from the original proposal. Ground was broken for the station on October 18, 2008.  A branch of the Bowdoin College bookstore opened in one of the buildings constructed as part of phase I of the development on October 30, 2009.

Construction of Building Three (connected to the platform) was completed in 2009, along with site work and preparation for the other buildings, including Building Four, which hosts the train station. In December 2010, construction began on Building Four (designed by Gawron Turgeon Architects, and built by Wright Ryan Construction). Mid Coast Hospital's Primary Care & Walk-In Clinic is the anchor tenant in this  development.

On January 28, 2010, the Northern New England Passenger Rail Authority received approval for a $35 million grant from the federal government to fund track and signal upgrades for the Portland-Brunswick line. Pan Am Railways began work on the line in spring 2010.

 Passenger train station 
The station serves as a terminus for Amtrak's Downeaster service. The station is staffed by volunteers. In 2012, Amtrak built a longer high-level platform in preparation for the extension of Downeaster'' service. Service to Freeport and Brunswick began on November 1, 2012.

Maine Eastern Railroad operated passenger service between Brunswick and Rockland from 2004 to 2015. Maine Eastern used the open lot on Cedar Street prior to the construction of the first phase of Maine Street Station, when it began boarding passengers from a portable platform at the beginning of the 2010 season.

References

External links 

 Brunswick Station – Northern New England Passenger Rail Authority 
 
 Brunswick Station development web site

Amtrak stations in Maine
Buildings and structures in Brunswick, Maine
Transportation buildings and structures in Cumberland County, Maine
Stations along Boston and Maine Railroad lines
Maine Central Railroad stations
Maine Eastern Railroad
Railway stations in the United States opened in 2012